The Murchison is an interim Australian bioregion located within the Mid West of Western Australia. Traditionally the region is known as The Murchison.

Geography
The landscape is characterised by low hills and mesas, separated by colluvium flats and alluvial plains. The western portion of the bioregion is drained by the upper Murchison and Wooramel rivers, which drain westwards towards the coast. 

Together with Gascoyne bioregion, it constitutes the Western Australian mulga shrublands ecoregion.

Population is scattered; the largest population centres are Meekatharra, Mount Magnet, and Leonora,  with smaller mining and pastoral towns at Yalgoo, Sandstone, Cue, Wiluna, and Leinster.

Subregions
The Murchison bioregion has two subregions:
 Eastern Murchison (MUR01) – 
 Western Murchison (MUR02) –

Political boundaries
Local government areas within the bioregion include the Shire of Yalgoo, the Shire of Mount Magnet, the Shire of Murchison, the Shire of Cue, the Shire of Sandstone, the Shire of Meekatharra, the Shire of Wiluna and the Shire of Leonora.

Climate
The climate is arid, with rainfall predominantly in the winter months.

Flora and fauna
The predominant plant community is low mulga woodlands and shrublands, characterized by mulga (Acacia aneura), with an understory of herbaceous ephemeral plants and bunchgrasses. Other plant communities include saltbush (Atriplex spp.) shrubland on calcareous soils, low samphire (Tecticornia spp.) shrubland on saline alluvium, and hummock grassland on red sandplains.

Land use
The Murchison is one of the main pastoral areas in Western Australia, dominated by large pastoral leases on Crown land operated as sheep and cattle stations. Mining (gold, iron and nickel) is the major contributor to the region’s economy. There are extensive mining areas, with a large number of abandoned historical mining towns and settlements. 

The Australian Square Kilometre Array Pathfinder radio telescope is located nearby, and was officially opened in October 2012.

Protected areas
Purchase of pastoral leases by the Western Australian Government increased the area set aside for conservation purposes from about 0.5% of the bioregion in 1998 to 6.7% in 2004. Protected areas include:

 Bullock Holes Timber Reserve
 De La Poer Range Nature Reserve
 Goongarrie National Park
 Matuwa and Kurrara-Kurrara Indigenous Protected Area
 Queen Victoria Spring Nature Reserve
 Toolonga Nature Reserve
 Wanjarri Nature Reserve

See also
 Mid West region of Western Australia

References

Further reading
Green, Neville, 1997 Aboriginal names of the Murchison District c. 1848-1890 (data processing by Susan Moon). Perth, W.A.
E.C. Grunsky ... [et al.] Report on laterite geochemistry in the CSIRO-AGE database for the southern Murchison region : Yalgoo, Kirkalocka, Perenjori, Ninghan sheets Wembley, W.A. : CRC LEME, 1998 CSIRO Division of Exploration Geoscience report ; 2R (CSIRO. Division of Exploration Geoscience) ; 2R. 
 Lefroy, Charles Bayden ...'talks about Murchison station life in the 1930s.'  Early Days, Vol. 10, Part 5 (1993), p. 503-512.
 Thackway, R and I D Cresswell (1995) An interim biogeographic regionalisation for Australia : a framework for setting priorities in the National Reserves System Cooperative Program'' Version 4.0 Canberra : Australian Nature Conservation Agency, Reserve Systems Unit, 1995.

External links
 Geological mapping of the region

Mid West (Western Australia)
IBRA regions
Western Australian mulga shrublands